Andrew Robert Frederick Ebenezer Hunter (born 8 January 1943) is a British politician and a member of the Orange Order. He was Member of Parliament (MP) for Basingstoke from 1983 until 2005. From 1990 to 2001 he was Vice-Chairman of the Conservative Monday Club and was chairman as of 2008, succeeding Lord Sudeley.

Early life
Hunter is the son of RAF Squadron Leader Roger F Hunter by his marriage to Winifred M Nelson/Hunter.

He attended St George's School, Harpenden and studied at the University of Durham (St John's College), gaining a BA in Theology in 1966 and an MA in History in 1968. He gained a Diploma in Education from Jesus College, Cambridge in 1967 then studied at Westcott House, Cambridge. Hunter worked as an Assistant Master at St Martin's School, Northwood from 1970–1971 and then joined Harrow School, where he taught until 1983.

Parliamentary career
Hunter contested Southampton Itchen as a Conservative in 1979, but lost to incumbent MP Bob Mitchell. Hunter was first elected to Basingstoke in the 1983 election. He is a member of the Conservative Monday Club and its Vice-Chairman from 1991 to 2001, when he was ordered by the Conservative Party to quit the Club. Since retiring as an MP he is once again Deputy-Chairman of the Club. Until 2002, he was a patron of the magazine Right Now!.

Hunter was active in thoroughly researching and exposing links of the Irish Republican Army (IRA) with other groups, including the South African African National Congress (ANC), and in July 1988 called for Margaret Thatcher to deport all ANC members then resident in Britain.

In 2002, he withdrew from the Conservative Party in order to contest elections for the Northern Ireland Assembly as a candidate of the Democratic Unionist Party (DUP). He had family and Orange Order connections with Northern Ireland and opposed the Good Friday Agreement. He stood in Lagan Valley in the 2003 Northern Ireland election, but failed to gain a seat, coming seventh in a six-seat constituency.

On 10 December 2004, he announced that he had joined the DUP Parliamentary Group in the House of Commons, the first mainland Member of Parliament in Great Britain to represent a party based in Northern Ireland since T.P. O'Connor, who represented Liverpool Scotland from 1885 to 1929 as an Irish Nationalist.

In February 2005, Hunter raised the case of Jeremy Bamber in Parliament, questioning his conviction for murdering his adoptive family.

Hunter stepped down from the House of Commons at the 2005 general election and suggested he would move to Northern Ireland to become more involved with DUP politics.

Personal life
He married Janet Bourne in 1972 in Harrow, and they have a son and a daughter. One of his recreations is collecting model soldiers. He is also a member of the Carlton Club.

References

Bibliography
 Right Now! magazine, (Various editions)
 Young European newsletter, December 1988 edition, published by Western Goals (UK), London.

External links
 Profile, TheyWorkForYou.com
 "Joining the DUP in December 2004", bbc.co.uk
 Profile, Ask Aristotle @ guardian.co.uk

Conservative Party (UK) MPs for English constituencies
Democratic Unionist Party MPs
People from Harpenden
UK MPs 1983–1987
UK MPs 1987–1992
UK MPs 1992–1997
UK MPs 1997–2001
UK MPs 2001–2005
1943 births
Living people
People educated at St George's School, Harpenden
Alumni of Westcott House, Cambridge
Alumni of St John's College, Durham
British Eurosceptics